René Lefèvre may refer to:

René Lefèvre (aviator), French aviator
René Lefèvre (journalist), French journalist
René Lefèvre (actor) (1898–1994), French actor